"Santa's a Fat Bitch" is a song written and performed by American hip hop duo Insane Clown Posse from their 1994 extended play A Carnival Christmas. It was recorded at the Fun House in Detroit and produced by Mike E. Clark.

The song also appeared in ICP's compilation albums Forgotten Freshness (1995) and Forgotten Freshness Volumes 1 & 2 (1998), and was released in 1997 as the b-side on Kerrang! magazine's free 7-inch single of "Halls of Illusions".

Reaching a peak position of number sixty-seven on the US Billboard Hot 100, the song remained on the chart for a total of five weeks.

Track listing

Charts

References 

1994 songs
Songs about Santa Claus
Insane Clown Posse songs